Kuaiji Shan or Kuaijishan (Chinese: t , s , p Kuàijī Shān) may refer to either of:

 Mount Xianglu, a peak southeast of Shaoxing in Zhejiang
 The Kuaiji Mountains, a mountain range south of Shaoxing in Zhejiang